The Outdoor Education Group is a non-profit, independent educational organisation which is one of the largest providers of outdoor education programs for school students in Australia.
The Outdoor Education Group, founded in 1994, provides journey-based adventure programs ranging from 2 to 33 days mainly to private schools in Victoria and New South Wales.

The main goals of the Outdoor Education Group are to enhance personal development, community, and appreciation of the natural world in young people by partnering with existing educational institutions. Depending on partnering school's specific missions, the Outdoor Education Group also seeks to develop students' academic, spiritual, artistic, and sporting domains.

Philosophy
OEG program philosophy is guided by a belief that the following aspects ensure effective outdoor education :

 A semi wilderness environment.
 Isolation from as many/all forms of technology and human impact/development.
 The presence of a course facilitator, and a structured curriculum.
 Small groups of learners (e.g. 16-18 or less)
 Continual contact with the learning medium.
 Appropriate level and forms of challenge (physical, emotional, spiritual)
 Transfer of learning to and from the course.

See also
 Experiential education

External links

References 

Outdoor education organizations
Educational organisations based in Australia